Love Alert is a 2018 South Korean television series based on the web novel of the same name by Seo Han-kyul. It stars Yoon Eun-hye and Chun Jung-myung. It aired on MBN's Wednesdays and Thursdays at 23:00 KST time slot from October 31 to December 20, 2018.

Synopsis
The series is about a celibate doctor named Cha Woo-hyun (Chun Jung-myung) who gets involved in a scandal with top actress Yoon Yoo-jung (Yoon Eun-hye) for inexplicable reasons. The two sign a contract where they have to pretend to be in love to achieve their mutual goals.

Cast

Main
Yoon Eun-hye as Yoon Yoo-jung
Chun Jung-myung as Cha Woo-hyun
Han Go-eun as Han Chae-kyung
Joo Woo-jae as Sung Hoon

Supporting
Pyo Ji-hoon as Yoon Yoo-joon
Lee Hye-ran as Joo Min-ah
Kang Seo-yeon as Kang Hye-joo
Kim Byung-ki as Cha Tae-soo
Oh Mi-hee as Ko Kyung-eun
Choi Cheol-ho as An Jung-seok
Kim Ye-ryeong as Na Hwa-jung
Choi Jung-won as Hwang Jae-min
Choi Jung-woo as Choi Kyung-jung
Jeong Gyu-su as Yoon Cheol-seo

Original soundtrack

Part 1

Part 2

Part 3

Part 4

Part 5

Part 6

Part 7

Ratings 
In this table,  represent the lowest ratings and  represent the highest ratings recorded by the series.

Production
In January 2019, YG Studioplex, the drama production affiliate of YG Plus, belatedly announced that it has terminated its co-CEO Cho Jung-ho and filed a case against him. According to the company, ex-CEO Cho made an illegal contract to sell the distribution rights of Love Alert in Japan to an unnamed Japanese distribution company through his own firm Barami Bunda Inc., which was a co-owner in YG Studioplex. Cho also stole much money from investors, one of those was the drama's co-producer The Groove Company.

Notes

References

External links
  
 
 

Maeil Broadcasting Network television dramas
Korean-language television shows
2018 South Korean television series debuts
2018 South Korean television series endings
South Korean romantic comedy television series
Television series by YG Entertainment
Television shows based on South Korean novels